Rhadinopsylla is a genus of insects belonging to the family Hystrichopsyllidae.

The species of this genus are found in Europe and Northern America.

Species:
 Rhadinopsylla accola Wagner, 1930
 Rhadinopsylla acuminata Ioff & Tiflov, 1946

References

Hystrichopsyllidae
Siphonaptera genera